The 2005 Tippeligaen was the 61st completed season of top division football in Norway. The season began on 10 April 2005, and was concluded with the last of 26 rounds played on 29 October. 3 points were given for wins and 1 for draws.

Vålerenga, the winner of this year's season entered the second round of next year's Champions League qualification, while the runners-up (Start), number 3 (Lyn) and the Norwegian Cup winners enter the UEFA Cup qualification round. The top four teams qualified for the 2004–05 Royal League.

1,726,145 people attended the matches, a new record for the Tippeligaen and 300,000 more than the previous year. It is also more than twice as many as in 1995, when only 841,717 attended the matches during the whole season. The 2005 season was, as of 2019, the last season where all the teams in the division played on natural turfs only.

Overview

Summary
The greatest surprises of the 2005 season were the great performance of Start, promoted to the Tippeligaen in the 2004 season and ended up winning silver, and the disappointing performance of Rosenborg which fought against relegation from the top division after winning it for 13 straight seasons.

The season ended on a sad note as Fredrikstad's Dagfinn Enerly got a serious neck injury in the last round match against Start on 29 October 2005, which made him a paraplegic. Start lost the game 1–3 which meant that Vålerenga secured their fifth league title with a 2–2 draw against Odd Grenland in Skien.

Number thirteen (Aalesund) and fourteen (Bodø/Glimt) were relegated to 1. divisjon, while number twelve (Molde) had to play a two-legged play-off (home and away) against Moss, third-place finisher in Adeccoligaen, for the last spot in next year's season. Molde won the play-off matches 5–2 on aggregate and remained in Tippeligaen.

Teams and locations
Fourteen teams competed in the league – the top twelve teams from the previous season, and two teams promoted from 1. divisjon.

Note: Table lists in alphabetical order.

League table

Relegation play-offs
Molde won the two-legged play-offs against Moss 5–2 on aggregate and avoided relegation.Molde won 5–2 on aggregate and remained in Tippeligaen.''

Results

International
Vålerenga goes to 2006–07 UEFA Champions League qualification round
Start (2nd), Lyn (3rd) and Molde (Norwegian Cup winner) go to 2006–07 UEFA Cup qualification round
Vålerenga (1st), Start (2nd), Lyn (3rd) and Lillestrøm (4th) qualify for 2005–06 Royal League

Season statistics

Top scorers

Discipline

Player
Most yellow cards: 7
 Runar Berg (Bodø/Glimt)
 Simen Brenne (Fredrikstad)
Most red cards: 1
19 players

Club
Most yellow cards: 47
Odd

Most red cards: 3
Rosenborg
Tromsø

Attendances

See also
2005 in Norwegian football
2005 1. divisjon

References

External links
Norwegian Football Association
Fixtures, results and table for Tippeligaen 2005

Eliteserien seasons
1
Norway
Norway